Falk is a logging company town that was included in the Headwaters Forest Reserve in Northern California. The town was founded by Noah and Elijah Falk. Noah Falk came to California in 1854 and formed the Elk River Mill and Lumber Company with two partners. Falk was built around the Falk sawmill in 1884 to house the families of immigrant lumberjacks from Sweden, Norway, Ireland and Nova Scotia. The town of 400 with a cookhouse, a dance hall, a general store, a post office and a school thrived until 1937 when the great depression closed the lumber mill and the town was soon abandoned. Among the last residents were Charlie Webb and his wife who acted as property caretakers for the lumber company. After Charlie died, the lumber company burned and demolished the buildings in 1979 due to liability concerns and a plaque stands in its place. Visitors to the Reserve may be told Charlie's ghost still haunts the forest reclaiming the town he once guarded.

References

External links
 Falk Historic Logging Ghost Town. Eureka-Humboldt Visitors Bureau.
 Humboldt Heritage Trails. Eureka-Humboldt Visitors Bureau.

Ghost towns in California
Former settlements in Humboldt County, California